Frassilongo (Mocheno: Garait) is a comune (municipality) in Trentino in the northern Italian region Trentino-Alto Adige/Südtirol, located about  east of Trento.

Frassilongo borders the following municipalities: Sant'Orsola Terme, Fierozzo, Roncegno, Vignola-Falesina, Pergine Valsugana, Novaledo and Levico Terme.

In the census of 2001, 340 inhabitants out of 357 (95.2%) declared themselves members of the Mócheno linguistic group.

Demographic evolution

References

Cities and towns in Trentino-Alto Adige/Südtirol